The 2012 Ohio Valley Conference baseball tournament took place from May 23 through 27.  The top six regular season finishers met in the double-elimination tournament, which was held at Pringles Park.  The Ohio Valley Conference has ten teams, but SIU Edwardsville was not eligible for postseason play.   won their fifth Ohio Valley Championship by a score of 3–0 and earned the conference's automatic bid to the 2012 NCAA Division I baseball tournament.

Seeding and format
The top six regular season finishers were seeded by conference winning percentage.  Austin Peay claimed the top seed by tiebreaker.  SIU Edwardsville was not eligible for postseason play, leaving the sixth seed to Southeast Missouri State.

Results

* - Indicates game required 11 innings.

All-Tournament team
The following players were named to the All-Tournament team.

Most Valuable Player
Greg Bachman of Austin Peay was named Tournament Most Valuable Player.

References

Tournament
Ohio Valley Conference Baseball Tournament
Ohio Valley Conference baseball tournament
Ohio Valley Conference baseball tournament